Meindl may refer to:

 Meindl (company)
 Meindl (surname)

See also 
 Meinl (disambiguation) 
 Meinel (surname)